The 2020 Winston-Salem mayoral election was held on November 3, 2020, to elect the mayor of Winston-Salem, North Carolina.

Candidates

Democratic

Nominated
Allen Joines, incumbent mayor

Defeated in primary
JoAnne Allen

Republican

Nominated
Kris McCann, 2012 & 2014 candidate for state House of Representatives

General election

References 

Winston-Salem
Mayoral elections in Winston-Salem, North Carolina
Winston-Salem